The Final Countdown: The Best of Europe is a compilation album by Europe, released in 2009 by Sony Music and Camden Deluxe.

This album contains some songs from their debut album and albums through 1999. This album contains 36 songs with 18 on each CD.

Track listing 
All songs were written by Joey Tempest, except where noted.

Personnel 
Joey Tempest – vocals, keyboards (all tracks)
John Norum – guitar, backing vocals
Kee Marcello – guitar, backing vocals
John Levén – bass (all tracks)
Mic Michaeli – keyboards, backing vocals (all tracks except 2–3 on disc 2)
Tony Reno – drums (tracks 2–6, 12, 15 on disc 2)
Ian Haugland – drums, backing vocals (all tracks except 2–6, 12, 15 on disc 2)

References

Europe (band) compilation albums
2009 greatest hits albums